
Gmina Skierbieszów is a rural gmina (administrative district) in Zamość County, Lublin Voivodeship, in eastern Poland.

The gmina contains part of the protected area called Skierbieszów Landscape Park.

Villages
Gmina Skierbieszów contains the villages and settlements of Dębowiec, Dębowiec-Kolonia, Drewniki, Hajowniki, Huszczka Duża, Huszczka Mała, Iłowiec, Kalinówka, Łaziska, Majdan Skierbieszowski, Marcinówka, Nowa Lipina, Osiczyna, Podhuszczka, Podwysokie, Sady, Skierbieszów, Skierbieszów-Kolonia, Sławęcin, Stara Lipina, Suchodębie, Sulmice, Szorcówka, Wiszenki, Wiszenki-Kolonia, Wysokie Drugie, Wysokie Pierwsze, Zabytów, Zawoda and Zrąb-Kolonia.

Neighbouring gminas
Gmina Skierbieszów is bordered by the gminas of Grabowiec, Izbica, Kraśniczyn, Sitno, Stary Zamość and Zamość.

References

Polish official population figures 2006

Skierbieszow
Zamość County